"Hard to Make a Stand" is the third single from Sheryl Crow's self-titled second album (1996). It was released as a single only in Europe, Canada, Japan, and South Africa. The track caused controversy in the US due to its references to abortion. The music video for the song, directed by Matthew Amos, is taken from a live performance in London. A live performance of this song is featured on Sheryl Crow's 2006 concert DVD: Wildflower Tour, Live from New York.

Track listings
UK CD1
 "Hard to Make a Stand"
 "Hard to Make a Stand" (alternate version)
 "Hard to Make a Stand" (live BBC Simon Mayo Session)
 "In Need"

UK CD2
 "Hard to Make a Stand"
 "Sad Sad World"
 "No One Said It Would Be Easy" (live from Shepherd's Bush Empire in London)
 "If It Makes You Happy" (live from Shepherd's Bush Empire in London)

European CD single
 "Hard to Make a Stand"
 "Sad Sad World"

Japanese CD single
 "Hard to Make a Stand"
 "If It Makes You Happy" (live)
 "On the Outside" (live)
 "No One Said It Would Be Easy" (live)

Credits and personnel
Credits are adapted from the UK CD2 liner and disc notes.

Studio
 Recorded at Sunset Sound Factory (Los Angeles)

Personnel

 Sheryl Crow – writing, vocals, bass guitar, acoustic guitar, Hammond organ, production
 Bill Bottrell – writing
 Todd Wolfe – writing
 R.S. Bryan – writing

 Steve Donnelly – electric guitar
 Pete Thomas – drums
 Tchad Blake – mixing, recording
 Jeri Heiden – artwork design
 Jim Wright – photography

Charts

References

1996 songs
1997 singles
A&M Records singles
Sheryl Crow songs
Songs about abortion
Songs written by Bill Bottrell
Songs written by Sheryl Crow